Marcel Balthasar (born 4 June 1939) is a Luxembourgian archer. He was born in Luxembourg.

He competed at the 1972 Summer Olympics in Munich, where he placed 39th in the men's individual archery event.

References

1939 births
Living people
Sportspeople from Luxembourg City
Luxembourgian male archers
Olympic archers of Luxembourg
Archers at the 1972 Summer Olympics